William Gibson Sloan (4 September 1838 in Dalry, North Ayrshire, Scotland – 4 September 1914 in Tórshavn, Faroe Islands) was a Plymouth Brethren evangelist to the Faroe Islands and Shetland.

Life 
His parents were Nathanael and Elisabeth Sloane (Sloan) who lived in Bridgend, Dalry. 

William became a missionary, sent by the Tract Society of Scotland, to Shetland and Orkney. While in Shetland, Catholic-born Sloan came into contact with local Plymouth Brethren and issues like "believer's baptism" and the "breaking of bread" came up. Sloan converted and became "baptised by immersion into the water" and thence "broke bread" with the local Shetland Baptists, even though he never considered himself being a Baptist. He believed in the one Congregation of God.

It was in this belief that he in 1865 decided to become an evangelist to the Faroe Islands, which he had heard of from Shetland fishermen, who earned their living by fishing in the vicinity of the Faroe Islands.

For many years, his work in Faroe had little effect, but eventually a few people started gathering in "Ebenezer Hall" also known as "Sloan's Hall", which was built in Tórshavn in 1879. As the number of congregants was increasing, a new and bigger "Ebenezer" was built in 1905. The congregation eventually grew into the biggest independent congregation in the islands, second only to the established church.

William Sloan died on his 76th birthday, 4 September 1914, in his home in Tórshavn.

Approximately 12% of the population in the Faroe Islands now belong to the local Brethren congregations founded by Mr. Sloan or "Old Sloan", as he is referred to in the Faroe Islands.

Family 
On 11 October 1881 William Sloan married Elsebeth (Elspa) Isaksen í Geil from Tórshavn, in Glasgow. William and Elspa Sloan had six children: Poul (born 1882), Elisabeth (Betty) (born 1887), Archibald (born 1890), Cathrine (born 1892), Anna Elisabeth (born 1895) and Andrew (born 1896). Elspa remained a widow until she died on 4 June 1939. The youngest son, Andrew, followed in his father's footsteps and became an evangelist in Faroe.

Literature 
 Fred Kelling: Fisherman of Faroe – William Gibson Sloan, Leirkerið Publications, Gøta, Faroe Islands 1993
 Tórður Jóansson: Brethren in the Faroes - An Evangelical movement, its remarkable growth and lasting impact in a remote island community, Tórshavn 2012, 
 In Faroese: Sigurd Berghamar: -men Gud gav vøkst – um William Sloan og fyrstu samkomurnar, Forlagið Afturljóð, Tórshavn 1992

External links 
 GOD'S INDESCRIBABLE GIFT at www.alfredplacechurch.org.uk

References

1838 births
1914 deaths
Converts to evangelical Christianity from Roman Catholicism
Faroese people of Scottish descent
Scottish Protestant missionaries
Protestant missionaries in the Faroe Islands
Protestant missionaries in Scotland
Scottish Plymouth Brethren
People from Dalry, North Ayrshire
Scottish evangelicals
19th-century Faroese people